Amatokos III (Ancient Greek: Αμάδοκος) was king of the Odrysian kingdom of Thrace.

References

See also 
List of Thracian tribes

4th-century BC rulers
Odrysian kings